Márcio Nuno Ornelas Abreu (born 25 April 1980) is a Portuguese former professional footballer who played as a winger.

Football career
After arriving in 1989 at hometown's C.S. Marítimo, and going on to represent its every youth sides, Abreu never settled in the first team, constantly bouncing between that squad and the reserves. In 2004, he was released and joined Madeira neighbours A.D. Camacha in the third division, the same as Marítimo B.

Abreu signed in the summer of 2007 with Bulgarian club PSFC Chernomorets Burgas, being regularly used during his three-and-a-half-season spell. In February 2011 he was transferred to Russia's FC Krasnodar, freshly promoted to the Premier League.

On 6 February 2011, Abreu participated in his first game for his new team, playing the first 72 minutes in the 2–2 friendly draw with Ukraine's SC Tavriya Simferopol. His first official appearance came exactly one month later, against FC Amkar Perm for the campaign's Russian Cup (120 minutes played, 1–0 win); his league debut occurred six days later, in a 0–0 draw at FC Anzhi Makhachkala.

On 10 June 2011, Abreu scored his first goal for Krasnodar, in a 3–1 away success against FC Rostov. He left at the end of 2013–14, signing with fellow league club FC Torpedo Moscow shortly after but retiring from the game shortly after for family reasons.

After two years of inactivity, 36-year-old Abreu returned to football with former club Camacha, still in the third level.

References

External links

1980 births
Living people
Sportspeople from Funchal
Portuguese footballers
Madeiran footballers
Association football wingers
Primeira Liga players
Segunda Divisão players
C.S. Marítimo players
First Professional Football League (Bulgaria) players
PFC Chernomorets Burgas players
Russian Premier League players
FC Krasnodar players
FC Torpedo Moscow players
A.D. Camacha players
Portuguese expatriate footballers
Expatriate footballers in Bulgaria
Expatriate footballers in Russia
Portuguese expatriate sportspeople in Bulgaria
Portuguese expatriate sportspeople in Russia